This is a list of cities, town and villages in Northern Cyprus which are uninhabited.  The list first lists the Turkish name followed by the English name.

Lefkoşa (Nicosia) 

Total: 4

Gazimağusa (Famagusta) 

Total: 5

Lefke (Lefka) 

Total: 5

References

\
Northern Cyprus